Sainte-Suzanne is a commune in the Doubs department in the Bourgogne-Franche-Comté region in eastern France.

Geography
It forms an arc of which each end rejoins the Allan River.

Population

See also
 Communes of the Doubs department

References

External links

 Official website 
 Sainte-Suzanne on the regional Web site 

Communes of Doubs
County of Montbéliard